Alfie Barbeary (born 5 October 2000) is an English rugby union player. having previously focused on hooker.

Early life 
Born in Banbury, Oxfordshire, Barbeary grew up in Deddington, starting rugby at age eight with Banbury RUFC.

Barbeary was part of the Banbury Rugby Club teams which won several Oxfordshire cups and Land Rover Cups at youth level. He was educated at Bloxham School and played in the team which won the u18 National Schools Plate in 2019. He started training with Wasps under-15.

Career
Having already captained England under-18 team, he made his debut for the under-20 in the 2019 Six Nations game against Scotland, scoring a try after coming on as a replacement  hooker. He also made an appearance with England's youth in the World Rugby Championship later that year.

Barbeary permanently entered Wasps’ Senior Academy squad for the 2019–20 season. After featuring in a Cup game with the senior team in 2018 as a substitute hooker, he spent some time in on loan with Nottingham R.F.C. during the 2019–20 RFU Championship, still being dually registered with Wasps.

Barbeary made his first start with the Coventry club in the Premiership on the 9 September 2020, scoring a hat trick against Leicester, making a strong impression playing as a blindside flanker. He became only the second player to score a treble on his first Premiership debut, after former Kiwis' winger Lesley Vainikolo.

Barbeary was called by Eddie Jones to the senior England team in November 2020 for the Autumn Nations Cup final.

In the following December, Barbeary made his European debut with Wasps, starting as a number 8 in both fixtures against the Dragons and Montpellier. Already successful in Wales, he proved to be instrumental in the home performance against MHR, proving to be a decisive forward, breaking lines and scoring tries, but also showing his back skills with kicks, offloads and try assists, and eventually being named man of the match.

Barbeary however ended the year with an ankle syndesmosis injury, only allowing him to get back on the fields in late March 2021, making the headlines as an early substitute against Newcastle Falcons, allowing his team to win the game after a come-back.

Wasps entered administration on 17 October 2022 and Barbeary was made redundant along with all other players and coaching staff. On 20 November 2022, it was confirmed that Barbeary signed for Premiership rivals Bath on a long-term deal from the 2022-23 season.

Style of play 
Alfie Barbeary was a centre through most of his youth career, naming Ma'a Nonu and Mathieu Bastareaud as his biggest influences. However, after entering Wasps' under-15 team he moved to the front row, becoming a hooker at both club and international levels. He has also frequently played in the back row, either as a flanker or a number 8.

Despite being viewed, including by head coach Eddie Jones', as a hooker in both England's youth and senior teams, — it is in the back row that Barbeary first took the spotlight with Wasps.  In November 2021, it was reported that he would focus on the back row, with Jones' blessing.

References

External links
Wasps profile
Itsrugby profile
England rugby profile

2000 births
Living people
English rugby union players
Nottingham R.F.C. players
Rugby union centres
Rugby union flankers
Rugby union hookers
Rugby union number eights
Rugby union players from Banbury
Wasps RFC players